Diner is a pinball machine produced by Williams in 1990. The objective of the game is to serve all customers in a diner. The table was marketed with the slogan "It's fresh! It's fast! It's hot!"

Gameplay
One to four players can play. Each player gets 3 balls per game. Serving all 5 customers (Haji, Babs, Boris, Pepe, and Buck) lights the "Dine Time" jackpot. It starts at 1 million points, and can be advanced up to 12 million points.

Playfield
The playfield includes 2 yellow flippers, a plunger, and 2 signature cross ramps, which is common in early 1990s pinball machines designed by Mark Ritchie. Both ramps can be used to obtain many points, as well as unlock extra balls (once five of those are earned, a bonus score is added per one earned thereafter).

Multi-ball
A player can easily obtain a multi-ball. To do this, they must unlock the Lock Mode on the cash register ramp, and shoot a target to unlock a second ball.

Digital Versions
Diner pinball is available as a licensed table of The Pinball Arcade.

External links

Pinball Archive rule sheet

Williams pinball machines
1990 pinball machines